Avetrana is a town and comune in the province of Taranto, part of the Apulia region of southeast Italy.

Main sights
 The Castle (13th century) or Torrione
 The Chiesa Madre (15th-16th-17th century)
 Palazzo Imperiali (17th century)

References

Cities and towns in Apulia
Province of Taranto